Pecos Bill: The Greatest Cowboy of All Time is a children's novel by James Cloyd Bowman about the American folk hero Pecos Bill. Raised by coyotes, the hero has various supernatural powers, including the ability to talk to animals, and becomes a spectacularly successful cowboy. The novel, illustrated by Laura Bannon, was first published in 1937 and was a Newbery Honor recipient in 1938.

References 

1937 American novels
Children's fantasy novels
American children's novels
Newbery Honor-winning works
Fictional feral children
1937 children's books